Lulu Hurst (1869 - May 13, 1950 ), also known as the "Georgia Wonder", was an American stage magician remembered for her demonstrations of seemingly miraculous physical strength. However, she later revealed that her feats had nothing to do with strength but were stage tricks accomplished by force deflection.

Career

Hurst was born in Polk County, Georgia, in 1869 as Lula Hurst, but was more often called Lulu. She began performing as a teenager. It was alleged in publicity promoting her act that Hurst had developed powers after an electrical storm.

Under the stage name the "Georgia Wonder" or "Laughing Lulu", the teenage Hurst specialised in demonstrations of great physical strength. Her act involved having a number of men hold an object (such as a chair or pole), and then moving the object and the men holding it with an apparently light touch. Her performances were popular in the early 1880s, drawing crowds in major cities such as Atlanta, New York, Indianapolis, and Chicago. She performed for only two years, before cancelling a planned European tour and retiring in 1885 (aged 16). Soon after her retirement, she married her former manager.

Methods

Hurst later admitted, in her autobiography, that her "supernatural" powers were in fact due to the judicious application of body mechanics and deflection of force, although she claimed that during her teenage years she had believed them to be genuine.

As Lula Hurst Atkinson, she died in 1950 and was buried beside her late husband in Madison, Morgan County, Georgia.

The magician Harry Houdini noted that her "methods consisted in utilizing the principles of the lever and fulcrum in a manner so cleverly disguised that it appeared to the audience that some supernatural power must be at work."

According to an article in Popular Mechanics her effects were "based almost exclusively on the pivot-and-fulcrum theorem of physics."

Skeptical investigator Joe Nickell has written that "Hurst was not the first such performer (nor the last) to make use of force deflection, along with other physical principles and tricks." Nickell also states that Hurst "became concerned with how spiritualists were embracing her as a powerful medium".

Publications
Lulu Hurst (the Georgia Wonder) Writes Her Autobiography, and for the First Time Explains and Demonstrates the Great Secret of Her Marvelous Power (1897)

In Fiction
The Magnetic Girl: A Novel (2019) by Jessica Handler.

See also
Dixie Haygood
Mattie Lee Price

References

Further reading

Walter B. Gibson. (1927). The Book of Secrets, Miracles Ancient and Modern: With Added Chapters on Easy Magic You Can Do. Personal Arts Company.
Barry H. Wiley. (2004). The Georgia Wonder: Lulu Hurst and the Secret That Shook America. Hermetic Press.

1869 births
1950 deaths
American magicians
People from Georgia (U.S. state)